New World Shadows is the fifth full-length studio album of Omnium Gatherum. The album was released in Germany, Austria and Switzerland on February 4. 2011, Finland, Sweden and Hungary on February 9., the rest of Europe on February 7. and North America on March 1.

The album is the band's first to be released via Lifeforce Records.

Track listing
All songs written by Jukka Pelkonen and Markus Vanhala.

Personnel
 Jukka Pelkonen – vocals
 Markus Vanhala – guitars, additional keyboards, backing vocals on track 2
 Toni Mäki – bass
 Aapo Koivisto – keyboards, backing vocals on track 2
 Jarmo Pikka – drums

References

2011 albums
Albums produced by Dan Swanö
Omnium Gatherum albums
Lifeforce Records albums